The list of shipwrecks in February 1914 includes ships sunk, foundered, grounded, or otherwise lost during February 1914.

3 February

5 February

6 February

7 February

9 February

10 February

11 February

12 February

14 February

17 February

18 February

20 February

22 February

23 February

24 February

25 February

26 February

27 February

28 February

References

1914-02
 02
1914